Miho River (Korean:미호강 / 美湖江), a tributary of Geum River, is a river beginning in Eumseong in Chungcheongbuk-do. Its length is about 37.5 km

See also 
List of rivers of Korea

References

Rivers of South Korea